Kaveri Gopalakrishnan is an Indian independent comics maker, illustrator, and art director based in Sydney, Australia. She is most notable for her interactive illustration "On The Roof" that was featured in the Women's Day 2018 Google Doodle. The illustration depicts Kaveri's love for reading. She was one among 12 female artists featured by Google to celebrate international women's day 2018.

Career 
Kaveri has been writing and drawing stories since she was a child. She completed her undergraduate degree in Animation Film Design from the National Institute of Design, Ahmedabad, India in 2012 and a research-focused Master of Design from the University of New South Wales, Sydney, Australia in 2020.

In 2013, Kaveri began freelancing as an illustrator for publishing houses. She has contributed illustrations to various organizations such as Chumbak, Pratham Books, GE Healthcare, Scholastic, Instagram, Facebook,and TedX. Her work can be seen in the following publications: The Best House of All, Two, Instaa Gyaan, Before You Step Out. She also designed a mobile-comic on the Indian movie Dangal (2016).

She is a co-founder of Urbanlore in collaboration with Aarthi Parthasarathy, founding member of international collective Kadak Collective, art director for a series of educational picture books for Pratham Books StoryWeaver and works as a freelance comic artist on socio-political, educational and mental health themes.

Exhibitions 
 2018 Mangasia: Wonderlands of Asian Comics, Barbican London
 2017 Internationaler Comic-Salon Erlangen, Germany
 2017 Delhi Comic Arts Festival, New Delhi
 2016 Comic Creatix: 100 Women Making Comics at House of Illustration, London
 2016 East London Comic and Arts Festival, London
 2015 Legend of the Drawing Board, Puma Social Club
 2014 Galleries, New York City

References

External links 
 Profile on Behance 
 Interview in Femina 
 Personal website 
 Interview by Facebook's India team
 Artist presentation at Delhi Comic Art Festival

Indian illustrators
Indian comics artists
Living people
Women artists from Karnataka
1988 births
Indian female comics artists
Indian women illustrators